William Bone may refer to:

William Arthur Bone, chemist
William Bone (MP)
William Bone (footballer) in 2001 S.League